The 1908–09 Pittsburgh men's ice hockey season was the 5th season of play for the program.

Season

The team did not have a coach, however, K. D. McCutcheon served as team manager.

The University had changed its name to the 'University of Pittsburgh' in the summer of 1908 but did not adopt the Panther as its mascot until November 1909.

Roster

Standings

Schedule and Results

|-
!colspan=12 style=";" | Regular Season

References

Pittsburgh Panthers men's ice hockey seasons
Pittsburgh
Pittsburgh
Pittsburgh
Pittsburgh